The 2009 Challenger of Dallas was a professional tennis tournament played on indoor hard courts. It was part of the 2009 ATP Challenger Tour. It took place in Dallas, United States, between 12 and 17 February 2010.

Singles main-draw entrants

Seeds

 Rankings are as of January 19, 2009

Other entrants
The following players received wildcards into the singles main draw:
  Chase Buchanan
  Amer Delić
  Alexander Domijan
  Donald Young

The following players received entry from the qualifying draw:
  Tobias Clemens
  Luís Manuel Flores
  Cecil Mamiit
  Scott Oudsema

Champions

Men's singles

 Ryan Sweeting def.  Brendan Evans, 6–4, 6–3

Men's doubles

 Prakash Amritraj /  Rajeev Ram def.  Patrick Briaud /  Jason Marshall, 6–3, 4–6, 10–8

External links

Challenger of Dallas
Challenger of Dallas
Challenger
Challenger of Dallas
Challenger of Dallas